Maddened by His Absence (also titled J’enrage de son absence) is a 2012 drama film written by Sandrine Bonnaire and Jerome Tonnerre, directed by Bonnaire and starring William Hurt, Alexandra Lamy and Augustin Legrand.

Cast
William Hurt as Jacques
Alexandra Lamy as Mado
Augustin Legrand as Stéphane
Jalil Mehenni as Paul
Matteo Trevisan as Félix
Francoise Oriane as Geneviève
Norbert Rutili as Le notaire

Release
The film premiered at the Cannes Film Festival in May 2012.

Reception
Brendan Kelly of the Montreal Gazette awarded the film four stars out of five, calling it "a remarkably assured directorial debut."

References

External links